Charles James Mayer,  (born April 21, 1936) is a Canadian businessman and former federal Minister of Agriculture. 

He was educated at the University of Saskatchewan and became an agrologist and farmer. Politically active, Mayer was president of the Manitoba Beef Growers Association before entering the House of Commons of Canada as a Progressive Conservative Member of Parliament in 1979. He represented the Manitoba riding of Portage—Marquette (later Lisgar—Marquette) until his defeat in 1993.

He served in the Brian Mulroney government as Minister of State for the Canadian Wheat Board until 1987 and then was Minister of State for Grains and Seedoils until 1993 also serving as Minister of Western Economic Diversification from 1989. In early 1993 he was promoted to Minister of Agriculture and was retained in that position during the short-lived government of Mulroney's successor, Kim Campbell.

External links
Agriculture and Agri-Food Biography
 

1936 births
Living people
Canadian farmers
Members of the 24th Canadian Ministry
Members of the 25th Canadian Ministry
Members of the House of Commons of Canada from Manitoba
Members of the King's Privy Council for Canada
Canadian Presbyterians
Progressive Conservative Party of Canada MPs